Moazzam Jahanzeb Ahmad Khan Wattoo is a Pakistani politician who was a Member of the Provincial Assembly of the Punjab, from 1997 to 1999.

Early life
He was born in Okara to the former Chief Minister of the Punjab Manzoor Wattoo.

References

Living people
Year of birth missing (living people)
Punjab MPAs 1997–1999
Moazzam Jahanzeb